Jennings Peak is a peak,  high, in the southeastern part of the Dunedin Range, in the Admiralty Mountains of Victoria Land, Antarctica. It was mapped by the United States Geological Survey from surveys and U.S. Navy air photos, 1960–63, and was named by the Advisory Committee on Antarctic Names for Cedell Jennings, U.S. Navy, an aviation electrician's mate at McMurdo Station, 1968. The topographical feature lies situated on the Pennell Coast, a portion of Antarctica lying between Cape Williams and Cape Adare.

References

Mountains of Victoria Land
Pennell Coast